Hydrobasileus brevistylus is a species of dragonfly in the family Libellulidae,
known as the water prince. It is found in Southeast Asia, Indonesia, New Guinea, the Solomon Islands and Australia.

Its natural habitats are freshwater swamps, lakes and ponds. The adult is a large dragonfly (wingspan 100mm, length 55mm) with its head and thorax black and yellow in colour. The abdomen is black with large yellow spots. In Australia, it ranges from the Northern Territory to Queensland and central New South Wales. The taxon has not been assessed in the IUCN Red List.

Gallery

See also
 List of Odonata species of Australia

References

External links

 World Odonata List

Libellulidae
Odonata of Oceania
Odonata of Asia
Odonata of Australia
Insects of Australia
Insects of New Guinea
Insects of Indonesia
Insects of Southeast Asia
Taxa named by Friedrich Moritz Brauer
Insects described in 1865